In thermochemistry, the Thomsen–Berthelot principle is a hypothesis in the history of chemistry which argued that all chemical changes are accompanied by the production of heat and that processes which occur will be ones in which the most heat is produced. This principle was formulated in slightly different versions by the Danish chemist Julius Thomsen in 1854 and by the French chemist Marcellin Berthelot in 1864.  This early postulate in classical thermochemistry became the controversial foundation of a research program that would last three decades.

This principle came to be associated with what was called the thermal theory of affinity, which postulated that the heat evolved in a chemical reaction was the true measure of its affinity.  This hypothesis was later disproved, however, when in 1882 the German scientist Hermann von Helmholtz proved that affinity was not given by the heat evolved in a chemical reaction but rather by the maximum work, or free energy, produced when the reaction was carried out reversibly.

References

See also
Principle of maximum work.

Thermochemistry
Obsolete scientific theories